Boxer TV Access is a Swedish brand owned by Tele2 AB providing pay television channels on the digital terrestrial television network in Sweden. Modeled on the British ITV Digital, it was founded in October 1999. Some channels on the Swedish DTT are free-to-air, but most of the channels require subscription from Boxer. Boxer has claimed to have around 500,000 subscribers by June 2016 when it was acquired by ComHem.

Boxer offers dozens of channels, with the number of channels varying depending on location and how one wants to count. As of early 2008, channels from Boxer broadcast on four national transmitter networks, of which three (MUX2, MUX3 and MUX4) can be received by 98 percent of the population using a regular antenna. The fourth network, named MUX5, has lower coverage. Another transmitter network (MUX1) has higher coverage but it doesn't contain any Boxer channels.

The majority shareholder was held in Boxer TV Access by Teracom which is owned by the Swedish state. The British venture capital firm 3i held a 30 percent stake. Teracom acquired this 30% stake from 3i in November 2008. Teracom sees this 100% stake as a logical next step. 3I had held the 30% having acquired the shares from Skandia Media Invest in 2005. With its 100% stake, Teracom moves from majority to sole shareholder in Boxer.

"Teracom has always been the main shareholder in Boxer and acquiring all the shares is a logical continuation of that ownership. Boxer will continue its successful business in the same manner as before, that is being a pay-TV operator dedicated to terrestrial platforms and working independently of any individual broadcaster", says Crister Fritzson, CEO of Teracom.

In March 2008, Boxer TV A/S, a subsidiary of Boxer TV Access, won the franchise to build and operate the terrestrial pay television platform in Denmark. In February 2009 it launched this service in Jutland covering West Denmark. This service will extend during 2009 to most of Denmark.

In 2008, Boxer announced that it had put in a bid to operate three of the four multiplexes of the DTT service for Ireland, in conjunction with Irish company Communicorp. On 21 July 2008 Boxer DTT Ireland were awarded the Irish franchise Boxer TV Ireland subject to contract. However, on 20 April 2009 the Broadcasting Commission of Ireland announced that contract negotiations had ended and Boxer DTT Ireland had withdrawn its application to operate the multiplexes.

In 2016, Sweden's operator Com Hem announced it had acquired Boxer TV-Access AB for an enterprise value of SEK 1,330m.

Channels

 MPEG-4 indicates that the channel requires a DVB-T or DVB-T2 receiver with MPEG-4 support.
 HDTV indicates that the channel requires a HD-ready TV and a DVB-T2 HDTV receiver.

Monopoly distribution
Boxer had a monopoly for encrypted of television signals in the digital terrestrial network. If a broadcaster got to distribute television it had to either broadcast free-to-air or use the encryption services of Boxer. This was a contravention to European Union rules which require that there is an open market for radio and television broadcasting. On 17 October 2006 the European Commission announced that it was taking Sweden to the European Court of Justice for failure to abolish the monopoly. Neelie Kroes, Commissioner for Competition, said: "I regret that I have had to refer Sweden to the Court, but Swedish viewers should no longer be denied their right, guaranteed by (EU) law, to choose digital terrestrial TV suppliers".

The case against Sweden at the European Court of Justice taken by the European Commission, has since been withdrawn as a result of Sweden's amendment of the broadcast regulations. Previously, Sweden only allowed a single operator to handle all encryption services on the DTT platform but under the amended regulation, new operators will be able to offer encrypted DTT services making it possible for them to launch pay-DTT services.

See also
 Boxer TV Denmark
 Boxer TV Ireland

References

External links
http://www.boxer.se/ – Official site

Television in Sweden
1999 establishments in Sweden
3i Group companies
Digital television
Pay television

da:Boxer TV